The 1st Awit Awards were held on March 23, 1969, in Makati. These awards recognized musical achievements for the year 1968. This was the only award ceremony organized by the Awit Awards Executive Committee after the Philippine Academy of Recording Arts and Sciences (PARAS) took charge the next year.

A total of 28 awards were presented that night. Another category, the Visiting Recording Artist of the Year, would be given in the foreign division supposedly but due to lack of nominees, it was not awarded. Pauline Sevilla won the most awards with three.

Winners

Local Division

English

Vernacular

Foreign Division

Special awards

Notes:

It is currently unknown which album of Leopoldo Silos won the "Best Instrumental Album".
Although this single was originally released in 1965, it was included in the album, The Graduate, which, on the other hand, was released in 1968.

References

Awit Awards
1969 in the Philippines
1969 music awards